Waldemar Kikolski (21 October 1967 - 1 May 2001) was a paralympic athlete from Poland competing mainly in category T11 distance running events.

Biography
Waldemar has successfully competed at three summer paralympics.  His first were in Barcelona in 1992 where he won the B2 class 800m and finished second in the 1500m and 5000m. At the 1996 Summer Paralympics he moved up in distance winning the T11 Marathon, second in the 10000m and third in 5000m as well as competing in the 1500m. His third and final appearance came in the 2000 Summer Paralympics where he again won a gold in medal at the marathon but missed out on a medal in the 10000m.

Kikolski died in a road accident in Třanovice when he was travelling back from an athletics competition in Italy.

References

1967 births
2001 deaths
Paralympic athletes of Poland
Polish male middle-distance runners
Polish male long-distance runners
Polish male marathon runners
Athletes (track and field) at the 1992 Summer Paralympics
Athletes (track and field) at the 1996 Summer Paralympics
Athletes (track and field) at the 2000 Summer Paralympics
Paralympic gold medalists for Poland
Paralympic silver medalists for Poland
Paralympic bronze medalists for Poland
Medalists at the 1992 Summer Paralympics
Medalists at the 1996 Summer Paralympics
Medalists at the 2000 Summer Paralympics
Paralympic medalists in athletics (track and field)
Road incident deaths in the Czech Republic
People from Łapy
21st-century Polish people
20th-century Polish people
Visually impaired middle-distance runners
Visually impaired long-distance runners
Visually impaired marathon runners
Paralympic middle-distance runners
Paralympic long-distance runners
Paralympic marathon runners